Not to be confused with David A. Harris, President and C.E.O. of the National Jewish Democratic Council.

David Harris (born September 23, 1949) is an American political activist who served as the CEO of the American Jewish Committee (AJC), one of the oldest Jewish advocacy organizations in the United States, from 1990 to 2022.

During his tenure, AJC became a global organization and began quiet engagement with countries in the Arab world, laying the  groundwork for the Abraham Accords. For his international diplomacy, former Israeli Prime Minister Shimon Peres called Harris "the foreign minister of the Jewish people."

Early life
Harris was born in New York City in 1949, the son of Holocaust survivors. He attended the Franklin School, then graduated from the University of Pennsylvania in 1971. He received a master's degree and completed his doctoral studies at the London School of Economics. Harris also was a Senior Associate at Oxford University (St. Antony's College).

In 1971, Harris worked as an English teacher in Moscow through a program with the American Field Service. During his time in the Soviet Union, Harris first became involved with Jewish refuseniks. Shortly after his arrival in Russia, Harris was arrested by Soviet authorities. After a stint in Helsinki, Harris joined the Hebrew Immigrant Aid Society (HIAS).

AJC career
In 1979, he began working for the American Jewish Committee (AJC). In 1981, he left the AJC to take a position at the National Coalition Supporting Soviet Jewry. In 1984, he returned to the AJC and became head of its Washington, D.C. office in 1987. Beginning in 1990, Harris served as the Executive Director and then the CEO of the AJC.

Harris is a leading Jewish advocate who meets with world leaders to advance Israel's diplomatic standing and promote international human rights and inter-religious and inter-ethnic understanding.

Harris was central to the emigration of over one million Jews from the Soviet Union.

In 1974 and again in 1981, he was twice detained by Soviet authorities and, on the first occasion, was expelled from the country. In 1987, Harris was asked by the Jewish community to serve as the national coordinator for Freedom Sunday for Soviet Jewry—the 1987 demonstration in Washington that drew over 250,000 participants, the largest Jewish gathering in American history.

For 16 years, Harris was involved in the successful struggle to repeal the controversial "Zionism is racism" resolution (United Nations General Assembly Resolution 3379) adopted by the United Nations General Assembly in 1975, only the second time in UN history a resolution was repealed. He spearheaded the AJC's successful campaign to change Israel's status at the United Nations as the only nation ineligible to sit on the Security Council and to include it in one of the United Nations' five regional groups.

On behalf of AJC, Harris has been involved in a number of humanitarian initiatives in response to natural and man-made disasters, including in the Balkans, Middle East, Africa, Asia, Latin America and the United States.

Harris has testified  before the United States Congress in both the House and the Senate on several occasions regarding the Middle East, NATO expansion, Russian and Soviet affairs, and anti-Semitism, as well as before the United Nations Commission on Human Rights and the French Parliament. He has spoken at Harvard, Princeton and Yale Universities and many forums in Europe.

In 2008, Harris was the first American Jewish leader to speak at the World Economic Forum in Davos at a plenary session entitled, "Faith and Modernization".

He retired in 2022, replaced by Florida Congressman Ted Deutch.

Affiliations
David Harris is a member of the Council on Foreign Relations. In 2000–2002, he was a visiting scholar at the Johns Hopkins University School of Advanced International Studies. In 2003, he was awarded an honorary doctorate by Hebrew Union College. From 2009-2011, he served as a Senior Associate at Oxford University (St. Antony’s College).

Published works 
 In the Trenches: Selected Speeches and Writings of an American Jewish Activist, Vol. 1, 1979–99, KTAV, 
 In the Trenches: Selected Speeches and Writings of an American Jewish Activist, Vol. 2, 2000–01, KTAV, 
 In the Trenches: Selected Speeches and Writings of an American Jewish Activist, Vol. 3, 2002–03, KTAV, 
 In the Trenches: Selected speeches and Writings of an American Jewish Activist, Vol. 4, 2004–05, KTAV, 
 In the Trenches: Selected Speeches and Writings of an American Jewish Activist, Vol. 5, 2006–07, KTAV, 
 The Jewish World, HIAS, ASIN BOOOIBR1MG
 Entering a New Culture: A Handbook for Soviet Migrants to the United States of America, HIAS, ASIN BOOO6CRK6Y
 The Jokes of Oppression (with Izrail Ravinovich), Jason Aronson,

Honours and decorations

References

External links
 David Harris biography at AJC website 

1949 births
Living people
Activists from New York City
Jewish American activists
20th-century American Jews
American Zionists
Recipients of the Order of Merit of the Federal Republic of Germany
Chevaliers of the Légion d'honneur
Chevaliers of the Order of Merit (Ukraine)
Grand Cross of the Order of Civil Merit
Officers of the Order of Merit of the Italian Republic
American Jewish Committee
Neoconservatism
21st-century American Jews